Andijan District is a district of Andijan Region in Uzbekistan. The capital lies at the town Kuyganyor.

The district consists of 19 urban-type settlements and 9 rural communities. The urban-type settlements are Kuyganyor, Ayrilish, Butaqora, Guliston, Gumbaz, Zavroq, Qoraqalpoq, Kunji, Qoʻshariq, Namuna, Ogʻullik, Oq-yor, Rovvot, Xartum, Chilon, Chumbogʻich, Ekin tikin, Yangiobod and Gulobod.

References

Districts of Uzbekistan
Andijan Region